Tiger Feet is a popular song by the English glam rock band Mud, released in January 1974. Written and produced by the songwriting team of Mike Chapman and Nicky Chinn, it was the first of three number No. 1 singles for the band, in the UK Singles Chart. followed later that year by "Oh Boy!" and "Lonely This Christmas".

The band appeared on Top of the Pops wearing tiger slippers.

Co-writer and producer Mike Chapman credited bassist Ray Stiles with a particularly memorable bass lick which helped fuel the success of the record.

Release details
According to his son, Calvin Hayes, Mickie Most added the song to RAK records' lineup on the basis of the title alone.

The single was released on the 7 inch vinyl record format by the RAK music label.  The B-side of the single is  Mr Bagatelle.

"Tiger Feet" was featured as part of a medley on Mud's album Mud Rock, which reached number No. 8 in the UK Albums Chart.

Chart position and sales

"Tiger Feet" was a huge success, it was number No. 1 in the UK and Ireland charts for four consecutive weeks, from 26 January to 16 February, in 1974 and also topped the charts in the Netherlands.  It sold over 700,000 copies in the UK alone and over a million copies globally.  It was also the best selling single in Britain that year.

Certifications

Covers

A version of Tiger Feet was recorded by New Hope Club and appeared in Aardman's movie Early Man.

See also
 List of Dutch Top 40 number-one singles of 1974
 List of number-one singles of 1974 (Ireland)
 List of number-one singles from the 1970s (UK)

References

1974 singles
Mud (band) songs
Dutch Top 40 number-one singles
Irish Singles Chart number-one singles
UK Singles Chart number-one singles
Songs written by Mike Chapman
Songs written by Nicky Chinn
RAK Records singles
1974 songs